The women's 30 kilometre freestyle cross-country skiing competition at the 1998 Winter Olympics in Nagano, Japan, was held on 20 February at Snow Harp.

Each skier started at half a minute intervals, skiing the entire 30 kilometre course. The defending Olympic champion was the Italian Manuela Di Centa, who won in Lillehammer, then in classical technique.

Results

References

Women's cross-country skiing at the 1998 Winter Olympics
Women's 30 kilometre cross-country skiing at the Winter Olympics
Oly
Women's events at the 1998 Winter Olympics